There are at least 6 named lakes and reservoirs in Fallon County, Montana.

Lakes
 Lake Baker, el.

Reservoirs
 Buffalo Reservoir, el. 
 Lake Baker, el. 
 Rush Hall Reservoir, el. 
 South Sandstone Reservoir, el. 
 Sportsman Pond, el.

See also
 List of lakes in Montana

Notes

Bodies of water of Fallon County, Montana
Fallon